The discography of Relient K, an American Christian rock band, mainly consists of nine studio albums, ten EPs, including two Christmas albums, twenty one singles, and four compilation albums.

Albums

Studio albums

Compilation albums

EPs

Others

Singles 

Notes

 "Therapy" was not released as a single; however, it peaked at No. 46 on the Billboard Christian Songs chart.
 "Have Yourself a Merry Little Christmas" was not released as a single; however, it peaked at No. 11 on the Billboard Christian Songs chart.

Music videos

Compilation appearances

References

External links 
 Relient K on JesusfreakHideout.com
 Relient K on AllMusic.com
 [ Relient K on BillBoard.com]

Discography
Discographies of American artists
Christian music discographies
Pop punk group discographies